Terenty Fomich Shtykov (Russian: Терентий Фомич Штыков;  – 25 October 1964) was a Soviet general who supervised the liberation of North Korea, as the de facto head of its 1945-1948 military occupation and the first Soviet Ambassador to North Korea from 1948 until 1950. Shtykov's support for Kim Il-sung was crucial in Kim's rise to power, and the two persuaded Stalin to allow the Korean War to begin in June 1950.

A protégé of the influential politician Andrei Zhdanov, General Shtykov served as a political commissar during World War II, ending up on the Military Council of the Primorskiy Military District. Through direct access to Joseph Stalin, Shtykov became the "real supreme ruler of North Korea, the principal supervisor of both the Soviet military and the local authorities." Shtykov conceived of the Soviet Civil Administration, supported Kim's appointment as head of the North Korean provisional government, and assisted Stalin with editing the first North Korean constitution.

As the preeminent representative of the Soviet Union's political authority over the nascent North Korea from October 1945 until December 1950, Shtykov's legacy was to aid the  Kim family's rise to power. The war they started freed Kim from Soviet domination; China intervened following North Korea's poor military performance in the early autumn. Shtykov was fired as ambassador in December and demoted to major general the following month. He later served as the Soviet ambassador to Hungary from 1959 to 1960.

Andrei Lankov asserts that Shtykov made more impact on Korean history than any foreigner other than Japanese colonial politicians, and that he was "the actual architect of the North Korean state as it emerged in 1945-50." Several of Shtykov's policies, most notably North Korean land reform, are today credited to Kim Il-sung by official North Korean media.

Early life 

Shtykov was born in 1907 to a family of farmers in eastern Belarus. In 1929 he joined the Communist Party in Leningrad and became a Komsomol activist. In 1938 Shtykov became the Second Secretary of the Leningrad Regional Committee, where he became the protege of First Secretary Andrei Zhdanov. Zhdanov's support allowed Shtykov to rise rapidly: he even briefly held a leading role in the Great Purge that September.

World War II
During World War II, Shtykov served as a political commissar in several fronts near Leningrad. By the end of the war he was one of only three Colonel general political commissars (the highest rank allowed for political commissars in the Red Army). As political commissar of the Far Eastern Front, Shtykov assisted Marshal Kirill Meretskov in accepting the surrender of Japan in northern Korea on August 19, 1945. After the war, he was made deputy commander of the Primorskiy Military District.

Supreme Leader of North Korea 

Following the division of Korea, Joseph Stalin sought to turn northern Korea into a socialist buffer state between the Soviet bloc and the American occupation in the southern half of the peninsula. Shtykov's influence rose in tandem with the rise of his mentor Andrei Zhdanov, who was thought to be Stalin's most likely successor after the war. As member of the Military Council for the Primorskiy District, Shtykov frequently visited Pyongyang and communicated to Zhdanov and Stalin about developments on the Korean Peninsula. Shtykov "exercised extremely close supervision over political events in North Korea" on Stalin's behalf. Shtykov also headed the Soviet delegation to the Joint Soviet-American Commission on Korea. The Americans thought Shtykov was a "hot-tempered authoritarian," and the two governments failed to negotiate a unified government for the Korean peninsula.

As the most powerful man in the northern occupation zone of Korea, Shtykov personally selected the composition of the Soviet Civil Administration, and its second leader would comment that “there was not an event [in North Korea] in which Shtykov was not involved.” Shtykov's strong support of Kim Il-sung was decisive in Kim's rise to power. Shtykov continued to be the preeminent power in the North after Kim was made chairman of the Provisional People's Committee for North Korea. In December 1946, Shtykov and two other Soviet generals designed the election results of the Assembly for the Provisional Committee. Without any Korean input, the generals decided "the exact distribution of seats among the parties, the number of women members, and, more broadly, the precise social composition of the legislature."

The original 1948 North Korean constitution was primarily authored by Stalin and Shtykov in Moscow. The constitution only went into effect after the two had a lengthy discussion editing the draft, though some articles were later rewritten by Soviet supervisors. The Democratic People's Republic of Korea was proclaimed after the withdrawal of Soviet forces in 1948, and Shtykov was named the first Soviet Ambassador to the DPRK.

Land reform 
General Shtykov was the main instigator of North Korea's March 1946 land reform program, though Kim Il-sung usually gets the credit for it in both North and South Korea. Originally, the Soviet blueprint for land reform had involved compensating the large landowners and selling the land to the farmers. Shtykov suggested that the land be confiscated from landowners and Japanese collaborators and distributed to poor and landless peasants without compensation. The nationwide land reform broke the feudal socioeconomic structure and proved highly popular with many North Korean peasants. Many rich landowners and collaborators fled South, allowing the reform to happen with little bloodshed.

Korean War 
While Stalin intended to use North Korea as a buffer state to the Western-friendly South Korea and Japan, Shtykov was sympathetic to North Korean attempts to liberate the South through socialism. Shtykov supported Kim Il-sung and Bak Heon-yong's 31 May 1949 proposal to create a Democratic Front for the Reunification of the Fatherland to advocate for peaceful unification of North and South, noting that Syngman Rhee's likely refusal would damage his legitimacy among the Korean population. Shtykov suspected that Rhee would attack the North by June 1950, and backed the DFUF "to slow down southern aggression, cultivate alliances with anti-Rhee forces in the South, and make the West appear opposed to North-South unification." After the victory of the People's Republic of China in the Chinese Civil War Kim persistently lobbied the Soviets to support a Northern-led violent unification of the peninsula.

Shtykov was sympathetic to Kim's proposal and helped him persuade a reluctant Stalin to accept Kim's cause. Kim and Shtykov assured Stalin that the war would be a short victorious blitzkrieg "at almost no cost", and Shtykov predicted that it would not provoke a Western involvement. On June 25, 1950, North Korea invaded the South. Seoul fell rapidly, and by late July the DPRK controlled all of Korea save Busan and the surrounding area. But after the UN intervention at the Battle of Inchon, the military situation reversed. North Korea was only saved by Chinese intervention, but this was not enough to save Shtykov's diplomatic career.

Later career and death
After being fired, Shtykov was demoted to major general on 3 February 1951 and was appointed deputy chairman of Kaluga Oblast. He later served as First Secretary of Novgorod and Primorskiy Oblast, before being named Ambassador to Hungary in 1959. Shtykov's hardline Stalinism clashed with János Kádár's Goulash Communism policies, and he was recalled in 1960. He served as Chairman of the State Control Commission for the Council of Ministers of the Russian Soviet Federal Republic before dying on vacation in 1964.

Historic significance 
Shtykov's decisions proved highly consequential for the Korean Peninsula and the world. Although Shtykov was the preeminent leader of North Korea from 1945-1950, he allowed Koreans to take the credit for his policies. Shtykov's support of Kim Il-sung over other Korean communists such as Pak Hon-yong was a chief factor in the Kim family's rise to power. Additionally, Shtykov masterminded the 1946 land reform in North Korea, which was arguably the most popular policy conducted in either Korea. South Korea reversed the land reform during the brief United Nations occupation of the North, which provoked a backlash among Northern farmers.
Most significant was Shtykov's decision to support Kim's effort to violently reunite the peninsula, which ended his career. Had Shtykov been unsympathetic to Kim's expansionist aims, it is highly unlikely that Stalin would have authorized the Korean War. While the war did not end in the capitulation of the American-backed South, it did allow Kim Il-sung to secure effective North Korean independence from the Soviet Union. All of Shtykov's actions are today attributed to Kim Il-sung by North Korean official media, and even South Korean media assumes that Kim was the driving force behind land reform.

Awards and honors

A village in Shkotovsky District of Primorsky Krai was named  in honor of him. An embankment in Staraya Russa was also named after him.

References

 

 

1907 births
1964 deaths
People from Gorodoksky Uyezd
Central Committee of the Communist Party of the Soviet Union members
First convocation members of the Supreme Soviet of the Soviet Union
Second convocation members of the Supreme Soviet of the Soviet Union
Fourth convocation members of the Supreme Soviet of the Soviet Union
Fifth convocation members of the Supreme Soviet of the Soviet Union
Ambassadors of the Soviet Union to North Korea
Ambassadors of the Soviet Union to Hungary
Anti-revisionists
Kim Il-sung
Soviet colonel generals
Soviet military personnel of the Winter War
Soviet military personnel of World War II
Recipients of the Order of Lenin
Recipients of the Order of the Red Banner
Recipients of the Order of Kutuzov, 1st class
Recipients of the Order of Suvorov, 1st class
Burials at Bogoslovskoe Cemetery